The World Triathlon Sprint Championships is a triathlon competition covering distances of 750 m swim, 20 km bicycle and 5 km run and is organised by the World Triathlon. The inaugural championships took place in 2010. In 2011 the championship was held as an event as part of the 2011 ITU World Championship Series. Great Britain's Jonathan Brownlee was the male champion in both editions, while Swede Lisa Norden and Chilean Barbara Riveros Diaz won the first two women's championships. However, for every year after 2011 multiple sprint events were held as part of the World Triathlon Series with no delineation made between them, and so no title was awarded at sprint distances at the elite level. 

In 2021 Bermuda, as one leg of the World Triathlon Championship Series was selected to host a combined World Triathlon Sprint & Relay Championships, also incorporating the World Triathlon Mixed Relay Championships, and reintroducing a sprint championship in a new multi-race 'Eliminator' format, but the event was cancelled following COVID-19 restrictions. The combined event took place the following year in Montréal, Canada on 25 June 2022. 

The Championships' eliminator format included multiple races of a super-sprint distance (300 m swim, 5 km bike and 2.5 km run) over several days of racing. Athletes begin by competing in super-sprint qualifiers with the top 10 finishers in each of two heats proceeding to the final. For those outside the top 10, a final repechages is held, where they compete again, with the top 10 again reaching the final for a final field of thirty. In the final, the eliminators adopt a 'Devil' format (from 'devil take the hindmost'). 30 athletes compete in the first super sprint, with the last ten eliminated; thirty minutes later a further super-sprint eliminates a further ten from the smaller field of twenty before the final super-sprint race of ten athletes is held to decide the World sprint title. Each elimination race lasts around 20 to 25 minutes, as compared to the hour for 'sprint' distance and 1 he 30 to 2 hour time frame of standard distance triathlon. The final day event therefore lasts approximately two and a half hours, but consists of multiple shorter, more intense races in which transition is unusually important.

The first eliminator format World Sprint champions in 2022 both represented Great Britain, Alex Yee in the male event, and Georgia Taylor-Brown in the women's equivalent.

Medalists

Men's championship

Women's championship

Venues

References

 

Sprint distance
Recurring sporting events established in 2010
Triathlon world championships